Jennifer Zika (born 22 November 1984) is an Austrian former professional tennis player.

Born and raised in Wels, Zika made a WTA Tour main draw appearance as a 15-year old at the Austrian Open in 2000, losing in the first round to Petra Rampre. She had been a top junior player in Austria but only competed briefly on the professional tour, opting instead to attend Duke University, where she featured on the varsity team.

ITF finals

Doubles: 1 (0–1)

References

External links
 
 

1984 births
Living people
Austrian female tennis players
Duke Blue Devils women's tennis players
People from Wels
Sportspeople from Upper Austria